The Armenian bumblebee (Bombus armeniacus) is a species of bumblebee found in Greece, Austria, the Czech Republic, Russia, and the Near East.

References 

Bumblebees
Hymenoptera of Asia
Hymenoptera of Europe
Fauna of Armenia
Insects of Russia
Insects described in 1877